Tropical pewee  has been split into three species:
 Northern tropical pewee, Contopus bogotensis
 Southern tropical pewee, 	Contopus cinereus
 Tumbes pewee, Contopus punensis

Birds by common name